The Diocese of Shinyanga is a northern diocese in the Anglican Church of Tanzania: its current bishop is the Rt Rev Johnson  Chinyong'ole.

Notes

Anglican Church of Tanzania dioceses
Shinyanga Region
Anglican realignment dioceses